Pavel Petrovich Vopilov (1875/1878, in Orenburg Governorate – after June 1907) was a peasant, an awards-winning village teacher and a deputy of the Second Imperial Duma from Orenburg Governorate in 1907. He was considered to have right political views, but joined the Constitutional Democratic Party faction in the Duma.

Literature 
 Вопилов Павел Петрович (in Russian) // Государственная дума Российской империи: 1906—1917 / Б. Ю. Иванов, А. А. Комзолова, И. С. Ряховская. — Москва: РОССПЭН, 2008. — P. 103. — 735 p. — .
 Члены Государственной Думы (портреты и биографии). Второй созыв. 1907—1912 гг. / Сост. М. М. Боиович. — Москва, 1907. — P. 212. (in Russian)
 Вопилов Павел Петрович (in Russian) // Челябинская область: энциклопедия / гл. ред. К. Н. Бочкарёв. — Челябинск: Каменный пояс, 2008. — .

1870s births
People from Chelyabinsk Oblast
People from Orenburg Governorate
Russian Constitutional Democratic Party members
Members of the 2nd State Duma of the Russian Empire